was a town located in Kanzaki District, Shiga Prefecture, Japan.

Notogawa Station (Location: N35.179899,E136.165913) is the only Japan Railway station in Higashiomi. The station is a rapid stop on the JR Biwako Line, located between stations in Omi-Hachiman to the east and Hikone to the west. The town shares a small border with Lake Biwa to the northwest.

History
On January 1, 2006, Notogawa, along with the town of Gamō (from Gamō District), was merged into the expanded city of Higashiōmi.

Demographics
As of 2005, the town had an estimated population of 23,385 and a density of 751.45 persons per km². The total area is 31.12 km².

Sister town
 Taber, Alberta, Canada.

External links

References

Dissolved municipalities of Shiga Prefecture